The 1904 Utah Agricultural Aggies football team was an American football team that represented Utah Agricultural College (later renamed Utah State University) as an independent during the 1904 college football season. In their third season under head coach George P. Campbell, the Aggies compiled a 4–8 record and were outscored by opponents by a total of 253 to 63.

The season featured a three-week trip to the west coast during which the Aggies played and lost five road games against Washington (0–45), Oregon Agricultural (0–45), Multnomah Athletic Club (0-29), Stanford (0-57), and Nevada (5-24). Prior to 1904, the Aggies had never played a game outside the state of Utah and had never played more than six games in a season.

Fullback Roy Egbert was one of the bright spots in the Aggies' 1904 season. At the end of the season, he was chosen by his teammates to be captain of the 1905 team.

Schedule

References

Utah Agricultural
Utah State Aggies football seasons
Utah Agricultural Aggies football